Spiceberg Slim is the eighth studio album by American rapper Spice 1.  The album was released in 2002 for Hard Tyme Records, & Riviera Records and made it to #79 on the Top R&B/Hip-hop album charts and #39 on the Top Independent album charts.  The album also featured guest appearances from Kokane, Tray Dee, Outlawz and Jayo Felony.

Track listing 
"Spiceberg Slim" - 3:38  
"Welcome Back to the Ghetto" - 4:09  
"If It Ain't Rough, It Aint Me" - 3:38  
"Its Nothin" - 2:53  
"Thuggin" feat. Kokane & Tray Deee - 3:39  
"You Got Me Fucked Up" - 3:25  
"Turn da Heat Down" feat. Outlawz - 5:17  
"Haters (Come out and Play)" feat. Spade - 3:44  
"Niggas I Roll Wit" - 3:44  
"Lucky I'm Rappin" feat. Jayo Felony - 3:46  
"Azz Hole Naked" - 4:07  
"Das OK" feat. Rappin' 4-Tay - 3:35  
"Pistols, Power, Paper" - 3:46

Samples
Das O.K.
"Strawberry Letter 23" by The Brothers Johnson
Pistols, Power, Paper
"I'll Play the Blues for You" by Albert King
Thuggin'
"No One's Gonna Love You" by The S.O.S. Band
Welcome Back to the Ghetto
"Inner City Blues (Make Me Wanna Holler)" by Marvin Gaye

Chart history

References 

Spice 1 albums
2002 albums